Theodore Vetoyanis (February 27, 1908 – May 22, 1984) was an American professional wrestler and sports promoter known by his ring name George Zaharias. He was also popularly known as "The Crying Greek from Cripple Creek" or "The Greek Hyena" during the 1930s. Often cast as a villain or sore loser, one of his most celebrated bouts was a 1932 match with Jim Londos at a sold-out Maple Leaf Gardens in Toronto, which Londos won. The audience  of 14,500 was the highest attendance for any North American wrestling match that year.

Background 

In 1938, Zaharias met Babe Didrikson, a talented athlete best known as a golfer, at a charity golf event; the promoter had matched the wrestler, the golfer, and a minister in a threesome as a gag. Zaharias and Didrikson married later that year, and Zaharias quit wrestling in order to manage his wife's career. He promoted wrestlers and ran a cigar store in Denver. As Babe's career soared, he managed a tailoring shop, a women's sports clothier in Beverly Hills, California, and a golf course in Florida, where the couple retired.

In 1975, Alex Karras portrayed George Zaharias in the TV movie Babe, (opposite his future wife, actress Susan Clark), which told the story of Didrikson, who won two gold medals in track and field at the 1932 Olympics and returned to become a champion golfer, her battles to be accepted as a woman in a man's sports world, and her fight against cancer.
Zaharias also did some part-time acting. The Zahariases had no children and were rebuffed by authorities when they sought to adopt.  He died in Tampa, Florida, having outlived Babe by 28 years.  He married actress Betty Burgess in January 1960 in Las Vegas.  He married one of Babe's nurses several years before his death.

Championships and accomplishments 
Professional Wrestling Hall of Fame and Museum
Class of 2020

References

External links 

"George Zaharias, Husband Of Babe Didrikson, Is Dead". The New York Times. May 24, 1984.
Special Collections and Lamar University Archives: Husband of athlete Babe Zaharias dies
Article on marriage to actress Betty Burgess
Babe, a 1975 TV movie biography, at The Internet Movie Database

1908 births
1984 deaths
20th-century American male actors
American male professional wrestlers
American people of Greek descent
People from Cripple Creek, Colorado
People from Pueblo, Colorado
Professional wrestlers from Colorado
Professional Wrestling Hall of Fame and Museum
Sportspeople from Pueblo, Colorado